Paul Alec Bilzerian (born 1950) is an American businessman and corporate takeover specialist.

Education and family
Bilzerian was born in Miami, Florida but grew up in Worcester, Massachusetts in an Armenian American family. His father, a civil servant, and his mother later divorced, leading to troubled teenage years for Bilzerian; he would later describe himself as a "juvenile delinquent". Called into the principal's office of his high school one day in 1968 for violating the dress code by wearing blue jeans, Bilzerian responded by dropping out of school. 

However, after serving in the Vietnam War and earning a Vietnamese Gallantry Cross, Bronze Star Medal, and Army Commendation Medal, he went to college and earned a Bachelor of Arts with Honors in Political Science and graduated With Distinction from Stanford University in 1975. Bilzerian entered Harvard Business School that same year. He was unsure about his choice to attend, having passed on offers of admissions to several law schools to enroll at HBS. After his graduation, Bilzerian married Stanford classmate Terri L. Steffen in 1978, and moved with her to St. Petersburg, Florida.

Bilzerian has two sons, Adam and Dan Bilzerian. Both Adam and Dan went on to careers as professional poker players. 

In June 2014, Bloomberg News reported that Paul Bilzerian had become one of the licensed service providers who processed applications for the same Saint Kitts and Nevis citizenship-by-investment program which his son had used.  The report added that Bilzerian had gone on to process a citizenship-by-investment application for Bitcoin investor Roger Ver, and that the two men had co-launched a website through which customers could use Bitcoins to pay for the fees and the real estate purchase in the citizenship-by-investment program. The government of Saint Kitts and Nevis responded in a statement the following week that Bitcoin was not an acceptable payment method for participation in the program.

Career
One of Bilzerian's first business deals was an investment in the 1970s in a Tampa Bay-area radio station, WPLP, which he made with two Army colleagues from the Vietnam War who had experience in the broadcasting industry. However, in a dispute over control, Bilzerian left in the late 1970s to join his father-in-law in the real estate business.  After Bilzerian left the station its performance deteriorated which led to its bankruptcy and a lawsuit by Bilzerian against his former partners. Bilzerian's real estate investments were highly successful and led to the beginning of his fortune. In 1984, he moved to Sacramento, California where his father-in-law and another business associate lived.

Corporate takeovers
While living in Sacramento, in 1985 Bilzerian embarked on his first two high-profile takeover attempts, one of New York clothing manufacturer Cluett Peabody & Company, and the other of Pittsburgh construction company H. H. Robertson. After Bilzerian purchased a large stake and raised his bid for the remaining 76% of Cluett Peabody in October, Cluett Peabody's board of directors adopted poison pill provisions, earning them public criticism from Bilzerian. Cluett Peabody eventually accepted a competing merger offer by WestPoint Pepperell (now WestPoint Home) for $41 per share (in cash or equivalent value of WestPoint Pepperell common stock); Bilzerian and his fellow investors agreed separately to sell their stake to WestPoint Pepperell for $40 per share plus reimbursement of $7.5 million in expenses.

Bilzerian moved back to Florida in 1986. That July he and fellow investors William and Earle I. Mack (sons of New Jersey real estate developer H. Bert Mack) launched a takeover bid against the Hammermill Paper Company, purchasing about 3.3 million Hammermill shares at an average price of roughly $47 per share, and then offering $900 million ($52 per share) to purchase the remainder of the company. Bilzerian's offer was ultimately rejected when Hammermill sold out to International Paper instead at $64.50 per share, but Bilzerian and his fellow investors still made a profit of more than $60 million from the deal.

Singer Corporation
In 1987, Bilzerian began a takeover of defense electronics manufacturer Singer Corporation. In October 1987, it came to light that a group of investors led by Bilzerian had purchased 2.1 million Singer shares in the preceding two months. Singer seemed an unlikely target for a takeover; early reports cast doubt on the idea that the government would permit a hostile takeover of a defense contractor, and the company had already moved its headquarters from Connecticut to takeover-hostile New Jersey in an attempt to fend off a previous takeover by T. Boone Pickens. In January 1988, Pickens provided $150 million in financing which helped Bilzerian acquire Singer.

Singer chairman Joseph B. Flavin had died in early October, leaving the company unprepared for Bilzerian's cynical move. The Black Monday crash less than two weeks later spooked competing investors. But the United States government chose to grandfather Bilzerian's hostile bid, preventing the Omnibus Budget Reconciliation Act of 1987 from disallowing sales of assets in certain acquired businesses to be treated as capital gains for tax purposes.

Stock parking case
In 1986, the government stumbled onto an insider trading scheme whereby a Drexel Burnham investment banker named Dennis Levine was exchanging inside information for suitcases of cash from Ivan Boesky. This led to an indictment of Boyd Jefferies, the Owner & Chairman of Jefferies & Company. Jefferies cut a deal to testify against three individuals in the corporate and investment banking community, including Bilzerian.  The SEC then went after Bilzerian – focusing its investigation on whether he had failed to timely make two Schedule 13(d) filings and whether he was required to disclose investors in his partnerships. 

In May 1988, the SEC began a probe against Edward J. DeBartolo, Sr. to determine whether DeBartolo had illegally aided Bilzerian's hostile takeover attempts through "stock parking", in which one party purchases shares in coordination with another to keep legal ownership separated and avoid either party's holdings exceeding disclosure thresholds. Then, in December 1988 Rudy Giuliani announced that Bilzerian had been indicted in Manhattan by a federal grand jury for Schedule 13(d) disclosure violations with respect to Cluett Peabody and Hammermill Paper Company and general claims regarding failed takeovers of H. H. Robinson and Armco. Bilzerian claims he was "the first person ever to be indicted for 13d disclosure violations as the hundreds of previous cases were civil and resolved with consent decrees and without fines or penalties."

In January 1989, Bilzerian pleaded not guilty to the charges amid growing public controversy and demanded a speedy trial to clear his name. There were, broadly speaking, two different camps of opinion on Bilzerian's actions. Much of the public had a negative view of corporate takeovers in general and saw Bilzerian's activities as "greenmail", profiting by deceiving companies into believing they faced a hostile takeover attempt and scaring them into buying their stock from him at a high price. In Bilzerian's case he never sought greenmail and always offered all other shareholders all cash for their shares at prices substantially above the market. 

Many saw Bilzerian as guilty of nothing but making a profit in genuine-but-failed takeover attempts which benefited all investors. In an article in New York magazine, Christopher Byron questioned the entire basis of the case against Bilzerian, describing it as fueled by "Puritan envy". He further stated that the Department of Justice's primary motivation for the case was not the prosecution of wrongdoing but rather the need to justify its earlier unpopular plea bargain with Boyd Jeffries of Jefferies & Company, which would see Jefferies avoid any jail time at all in exchange for the opportunity to "drag some headline-sized names through the mud". Daniel Fischel, Dean of the University of Chicago Law School, argued Bilzerian was an innocent victim of an overzealous prosecutor, Rudy Guliani, and never should have been indicted as he was viewed as a hero to the shareholders of Cluett Peabody and Hammermill Paper Company.

After two days of deliberations in June, the jury found Bilzerian guilty on nine counts including conspiracy, making false statements, and securities law violations. In September, Judge Robert Joseph Ward sentenced Bilzerian to four years in prison and a fine of $1.5 million because he "now must pay the price" for testifying in his own defense. Bilzerian claims "Judge Ward had told me before trial that if I lost and did not testify I would receive no jail time, but if I lost and testified I would pay the price." Bilzerian was permitted to remain free pending appeal. Bilzerian's appeal came before the Court of Appeals for the Second Circuit, which in January 1991 ruled against him in a split decision, finding no merit in his argument that his trial had been unfair. He started to serve his sentence in December 1991 at the now-closed Federal Prison Camp, Eglin at Eglin Air Force Base, Florida. Bilzerian was released from prison in December 1992 to serve out his sentence under house arrest. Bilzerian has maintained that the Court of Appeals for the Second Circuit should have reversed and vacated his conviction based on two subsequent unanimous United States Supreme Court decisions that mandated his conviction be reversed. Instead, Bilzerian claims the Court of Appeals did not address the Supreme Court decisions and let his conviction stand.  After Bilzerian's release from prison, he became president of Utah-based software company Cimetrix. In 2002, the government confiscated Bilzerian's ownership in Cimetrix and Bilzerian claims the government drove the company from several years of high sales growth and profitability to the verge of bankruptcy.

Civil suit
After Bilzerian was convicted, the SEC filed a civil suit against Bilzerian based on identical charges to force him to disgorge the profits from the takeover attempts. Bilzerian claimed that this was double jeopardy as he had already been punished once for exactly the same conduct.  In 1993, a federal judge ruled in favor of the SEC and ordered Bilzerian to disgorge $33.1 million of profits, plus interest. The total amount to be disgorged was thus $62 million. In January 1994, Bilzerian also filed an appeal against the civil judgment in the Court of Appeals for the District of Columbia. However, the court rejected his civil appeal as well. The U.S. Supreme Court ruled in Kokesh v. SEC, 137 S. Ct. 1635, 1640 (2017), that disgorgement is a penalty which presumably would mean the Court of Appeals should have granted Bilzerian's appeal on Double Jeopardy grounds for being punished twice for the same crime. In June 2020, the Supreme Court ruled in Liu v. Securities and Exchange Commission (18–1501) that the Securities and Exchange Commission may seek and obtain disgorgement from a court as "equitable relief" for a securities law violation.

Due to the size of the disgorgement judgment against him, Bilzerian first filed for bankruptcy in 1991. Bilzerian emerged from that bankruptcy having disgorged all his non-exempt assets in settlement of debts that mostly consisted of claims by the government. In 1999, he tried to put his house up for sale in the prestigious Avila neighborhood of Tampa, Florida. After the SEC continued its pursuit of Bilzerian, the judge issued an order appointing a receiver over his assets and ordered him arrested for civil contempt. Bilzerian then filed for bankruptcy again in January 2001, declaring his non-exempt assets of $15,805 against $140 million in debts, most of which was for the government's disgorgement judgment. Under Florida Bankruptcy Law, the value of his primary residence was protected from creditors. The SEC alleged that Bilzerian was using bankruptcy as a tactic to block creditors from finding out the true value of his assets, and Bilzerian argued that was a total fabrication as the bankruptcy laws require full disclosure and a trustee to take possession of his assets. Bilzerian argued the real reason the SEC opposed his bankruptcy was so that the SEC Receiver could control all his assets through an extremely cooperative federal judge in Washington who allowed the SEC to go after Bilzerian's wife and children in conflict with an earlier bankruptcy court judgment.

On June 11, 2001, while Bilzerian was in prison, FBI agents raided his family's residence on the strength of a sealed warrant and seized computers, files, and a Beretta firearm. The raid appeared to be related to SEC contentions that Bilzerian had concealed his ownership of assets during bankruptcy proceedings by transferring them to trusts and shell corporations, which Bilzerian claimed was a total fabrication. Bilzerian unsuccessfully sued the FBI agent for filing a sworn affidavit that contained mostly false statements, but a federal judge dismissed the case. Bilzerian was released from prison in January 2002 pursuant to an agreement under which his wife, Terri Steffen would sell the residence and split the proceeds with the SEC, and transfer most of her wealth to the SEC. Bilzerian was critical of the deal, describing it as the SEC using him "as a hostage to extort money" from his wife. In May 2004, Steffen sold her residence for $2.55 million to a partnership controlled by a Belgian businessman; SEC attorneys approved the unusually low price. According to court documents filed in 2006, Steffen's parents purchased a 99% interest in that partnership three weeks later.

References

1950 births
American financiers
American male criminals
American people of Armenian descent
Businesspeople from Miami
Corporate raiders
Criminals from California
Harvard Business School alumni
Living people
People convicted of making false statements
Place of birth missing (living people)
Stanford University alumni